Brendan Muldowney is a graduate of Dún Laoghaire Institute of Art, Design and Technology, Ireland (The National Film School).

Career

Brendan Muldowney is an Irish writer/director. After graduating from the National Film School he wrote and directed 9 award winning shorts. "Innocence" won the Tiernan McBride – Best Irish Short Film Award at the Galway Film Fleadh 2002 among many others, while "The Ten Steps" has won twelve awards throughout the world including Best Short - Sitges Film Festival 2004.
His debut feature SAVAGE (2009) was nominated for 6 Irish Film and Television awards and he was nominated for the IFTA ‘Rising Star’ award. His second film, LOVE ETERNAL (2013) has played at over 80 festivals worldwide and was winner of the ‘Dublin critics circle’ award for best Irish film at the 2014 Dublin Film Festival. His film PILGRIMAGE (2017) starring Tom Holland, John Bernthal and Richard Armitage, premiered at the Tribeca Film Festival and sold to multiple territories, including the US (RLJ Entertainment) and the UK (Studio Canal). His next feature film, THE CELLAR, is finishing post production at present. He is represented by the Independent Talent Agency.

He will direct the horror movie The Cellar, starring Elisha Cuthbert and Eoin Macken.

Filmography
Muldowney has written and directed several feature movies:
 2010: Savage (director-writer)
 2013: Love Eternal (director-writer)
 2017: Pilgrimage (director)
 2022: The Cellar (director-writer)

References

External links

Interview with Brendan Muldowney about Savage for meg.ie

SPFilms Official Website
Galway Film something
savage the movie
 http://www.facebook.com/pages/Savage-The-Movie/339916004056

Irish film directors
Irish film producers
Irish screenwriters
Irish male screenwriters
Year of birth missing (living people)
Living people
Irish writers
Alumni of IADT